The Awakening is a 1980 British horror film directed by Mike Newell in his directorial debut and starring Charlton Heston, Susannah York, and Stephanie Zimbalist. It is the third film version of Bram Stoker's 1903 novel The Jewel of Seven Stars, following the 1970 television adaptation as The Curse of the Mummy for the TV series Mystery and Imagination, and the 1971 theatrical film by Hammer, Blood from the Mummy's Tomb (in which Ahmed Osman also appeared). It was released by Warner Bros.

Another adaptation of Stoker's novel was released directly to video in 1997 under the title Bram Stoker's The Mummy.

Plot
The film opens on an Egyptian archaeological dig in 1961. Three of the main characters are introduced: Matthew Corbeck (Heston), his wife Anne Corbeck (Jill Townsend), and Jane Turner (Susannah York). Matthew and Jane are discussing their efforts to uncover the tomb of an ancient Egyptian queen. Anne is distressed by the relationship between her husband and his assistant. It is later proved that her distress is justified.

Corbeck and Turner discover a long hidden tomb that bears an inscription: "Do Not Approach the Nameless One Lest Your Soul Be Withered." They continue on to discover the burial chamber of Queen Kara. As Corbeck prepares to breach the entrance, Anne begins a painful premature labour. Corbeck and Jane return to the camp and find Anne lying on the floor in a trance-like state. Corbeck takes her to the hospital and leaves her there so that he can return to the dig. Anne's pregnancy ends in stillbirth. As Corbeck and Turner open the mummy's sarcophagus, the stillborn infant is restored to life. Corbeck neglects his wife and daughter Margaret, and Anne takes the baby and leaves him.

Eighteen years later, Corbeck is a professor at a British university and married to Jane. Corbeck learns that traces of bacteria have been found on the mummy that threaten to destroy it. Corbeck tries to have the mummy brought back to England because he disagrees with the methods used by Egyptian professionals to preserve it. One of the specialists opposing Corbeck is killed in a freak accident, allowing Matthew to transport the mummy to England.

Margaret (Stephanie Zimbalist), now eighteen (the age of Queen Kara when she died), goes to England to meet her father against her mother's wishes. Corbeck and Jane tell Margaret all about Kara, the violent murders she committed, and the myth that she could reincarnate herself.

Corbeck's obsession with Kara grows and Margaret exhibits personality changes. People who resist Matthew and Margaret mysteriously and violently die. Margaret begins to notice the changes in herself and believes she is the one responsible for all the deaths. While visiting Kara's tomb, in Egypt, she and her father discover the Canopic jars that contain Kara's organs. Corbeck secretly brings the Canopic jars back to England. Corbeck wants to try the ritual to resurrect the ancient Queen. He believes that the spirit of the queen possessed his daughter at the moment of her birth, and that she intends to resurrect herself through the girl's body. He proposes that the only way to save Margaret, who has fallen into a coma, is to perform the ritual over Kara's mummy in the British Museum. He realises too late that Kara tricked him, and that the ritual enabled her to completely take over Margaret's body. The reincarnated Queen kills Corbeck, her future intentions unknown.

Cast
 Charlton Heston as Matthew Corbeck: Corbeck is a fictional British archaeologist and the main character in the film. Corbeck is obsessive about his work which leads to the end of his marriage with Anne. Heston has been criticised for his inability to produce a convincing English accent. 
 Susannah York as Jane Turner: Corbeck's trained assistant. According to Anne, Jane "worships" Corbeck and has been referred to by critics as "kittenish". Later we find out that Jane and Corbeck get married after Matthew and Anne divorce. In the latter part of the film, Jane becomes concerned with Corbeck's obsession with Kara and the reincarnation ritual. She dies as the result of an accident which takes place as she tries to destroy the organs.  
 Jill Townsend as Anne Corbeck: Corbeck's wife, who feels neglected by her husband and ends up leaving him because of this. She tries to convince Margaret to not visit her father by saying "Your father has a wife. He deserted us for her". 
 Stephanie Zimbalist as Margaret Corbeck: Matthew Corbeck's daughter is one of Zimbalist's first acting roles. Soon after her character's eighteenth birthday, she starts feeling an unexplainable urge to visit her father. As she becomes possessed by Kara she begins to do uncharacteristic things such as murdering people who get in the way of the ancient Queen.  Zimbalist has been critiqued for not being skilled enough to play both the roles of Margaret and Kara with subtlety and her creepiness near the end of the film is created more by her makeup rather than her acting. She is however, praised at being much better at performing the lighter scenes as Margaret.
 Patrick Drury as Paul Whittier: Corbeck's assistant in the latter part of the film and Margaret's love interest.
 Bruce Myers as Dr. Khalid
 Nadim Sawalha as Dr. El Sadek
 Ian McDiarmid as Dr. Richter
 Ahmed Osman as Yussef
 Miriam Margolyes as Dr. Kadira: Anne Corbeck's nurse during the birth of Margaret. 
 Michael Mellinger as Hamid
 Leonard Maguire as John Matthews
 Ishia Bennison as Nurse
 Madhav Sharma as Doctor
 Chris Fairbanks as Porter
 Michael Halphie as Doctor

Production

The film was announced in July 1979. Filming took place in Egypt and England.

Director Mike Newell later said the production of the film was "utterly terrible" although he 'adored' working with Heston. Newell recalled about Heston, "He's a great big [star]. 'He would come to all the rushes. He was at rushes every day." Newell would also remark that he found the final cut of the film to be "miserable in the sense that it got recut by a very, very nice man, Monte Hellman..."

Release

Home media
The film was released on DVD by Studio Canal on June 25, 2007. It was later released by Warner Bros. Digital Distribution on June 14, 2012.

Reception

TV Guide awarded the film 1/4 stars, commending the film's set design, cinematography, and soundtrack. However they criticized the film as being "predictable, unrelentingly dull, and padded with tedious Egyptian travelog footage". The Terror Trap gave the film 2.5 out of 4 stars, writing, "Subtle and slow paced, this might not appeal to all tastes, but is certainly worth a watch, particularly to see sci fi hero Heston in an uncharacteristically subdued terror performance." Gene Siskel and Roger Ebert gave the film negative reviews on their TV show, with Siskel saying it was one of the worst movies of 1980 and Ebert simply saying with a bemused laugh "This movie is ridiculous."

Box office
The Awakening earned $2,728,520 when it opened in theatres in 1980 and has a lifetime gross of $8,415,112.

References

External links

 
 
 
 

1980 films
1980 horror films
1980 fantasy films
British horror films
1980s English-language films
Films about archaeology
Films set in 1961
Films set in ancient Egypt
Films shot in Egypt
Mummy films
Films directed by Mike Newell
Films based on works by Bram Stoker
Orion Pictures films
Films based on Irish novels
Warner Bros. films
EMI Films films
1980 directorial debut films
Films shot in Cambridgeshire
Films with screenplays by Clive Exton
Films scored by Claude Bolling
Resurrection in film
Films about spirit possession
1980s British films